Tsitana, commonly called sylphs, is a genus of skippers in the family Hesperiidae are found primarily in Africa. These are small to medium-sized skippers that are primarily unmarked brown of the upperside wings. For other sylphs see genus Metisella.

Species
Listed alphabetically:
Tsitana dicksoni Evans, 1955 – Dickson's sylph
Tsitana tsita (Trimen, 1870) – dismal sylph
Tsitana tulbagha Evans, 1937 – Tulbagh sylph
Tsitana uitenhaga Evans, 1937 – Uitenhage sylph
Tsitana wallacei (Neave, 1910) – Wallace's sylph

References

Natural History Museum Lepidoptera genus database

Heteropterinae
Hesperiidae genera